The Korean Decimal Classification (KDC) is a system of library classification used in South Korea. The structure and main level classes of the KDC are based on the Dewey Decimal Classification. The KDC is maintained and published by the Classification Committee of the Korean Library Association. The first edition of the classification was published in 1964; the most recent edition is the sixth edition published in 2013. Almost all school and public libraries in South Korea use the KDC to organize their collections, as well as the National Library of Korea and some university libraries.

History
Multiple library classification systems had been developed for Korean libraries before the publication of the KDC. These included the Railway Bureau Library Classification (1920), the Korean Decimal Classification edited by Bong-Suk Park (known as KDCP, 1947), the Han-Un Decimal Classification (1954), and the Kuk-Yeon Decimal Classification (1958).After the disappearance of editor Bong-Suk Park in the 1950s, the KDCP system decreased in use. Korean librarians considered adopting the Dewey Decimal Classification (DDC), especially after it was implemented at Yonsei University in 1957, but struggled to apply it to East Asian and Korean-focused works in their collections.

In February 1963, members of the Korean Library Association's Classification were appointed to create a national classification; they decided to make revisions to the order of the main classes of the DDC, for example bringing together the class Language (700) together with the class for Literature (800). Committee members prepared draft classes and indexes and the first edition of the KDC was published in May 1964.Both the text and the index were written in Korean Hangul characters and Chinese characters. The second edition was published just two years later, in 1966, correcting errors and omissions found in the first edition. The third edition was published in 1980, maintaining the basic framework of the previous editions while expanding significantly.

The fourth edition, published in 1996, made considerable changes, including increasing the number of representatives on the Classification Committee. The committee sought feedback from the library community and implemented revisions included in the recently published edition 20 of the DDC and edition 9 of the Nippon Decimal Classification. New policies applied to the fourth edition included principles suggesting the main classes should remain as static as possible, with focus shown to expanding classes devoted to technology and science. Likewise, many subject specialists were consulted for the publication of the fifth edition in 2009. The publication of the 23rd edition of the DDC in 2011 provided opportunity for a new revision of the KDC, and the sixth edition was published in July 2013. Greater numbers of classes provided number building capacity in the sixth edition, allowing for more specificity.

Description

The KDC classifies resources primarily by discipline, though some classes are collocated by subject. There are eight auxiliary mnemonic tables used to expand class numbers.

The main classes of the KDC are the same as the main classes of the Dewey Decimal Classification, but four of those main classes are in a different order: Natural sciences (400), Technology and engineering (500), Arts (600), and Language 700. Though the structure is heavily influenced by the DDC, aspects of multiple library classifications have been invoked in the creation of the KDC, including the Library of Congress Classification for the arrangement of the social sciences (300), the Universal Decimal Classification for medical sciences (510), the KDCP for Korean and Oriental subjects, the Nippon Decimal Classification for those of Japan and Oriental subjects.

Classes of the KDC 6th edition
 000  General works
 000  General works
 010  Books, Bibliography
 020  Library & information science
 030  General encyclopedias
 040  General collected essays
 050  General serial publications
 060  General societies
 070  Newspapers, journalism
 080  General collected works
 090  Materials of province
 100  Philosophy
 100  Philosophy
 110  Metaphysics
 120  Epistemology, etc.
 130  Systems of philosophy
 140  Chinese classics
 150  Oriental philosophy and thought
 160  Western philosophy
 170  Logic
 180  Psychology
 190  Ethics, moral philosophy
 200  Religion
 200  Religion
 210  Comparative religion
 220  Buddhism
 230  Christian religion
 240  Taoism
 250  Chondoism
 260  [Unassigned]
 270  Hinduism, Brahmanism
 280  Islam, Mohammedianism
 290  Other religions
 300  Social sciences
 300  Social sciences
 310  Statistics
 320  Economics
 330  Sociology and social problems
 340  Political sciences
 350  Public administration
 360  Law
 370  Education
 380  Customs, Etiquette, Folklore
 390  Military science
 400  Natural sciences
 400  Natural sciences
 410  Mathematics
 420  Physics
 430  Chemistry
 440  Astronomy
 450  Earth science
 460  Mineralogy
 470  Life science
 480  Botany
 490  Zoological science
 500  Technology
 500  Technology
 510  Medical science
 520  Agriculture
 530  Engineering, technology, etc.
 540  Construction and architecture
 550  Mechanical engineering
 560  Electrical, comm. & electric engineering
 570  Chemical engineering
 580  Manufactures
 590  Human ecology
 600  Arts
 600  Arts
 610  [Unassigned]
 620  Sculpture, plastic art
 630  Crafts
 640  Calligraphy
 650  Painting, design
 660  Photography
 670  Music
 680  Stage performance, museum arts
 690  Amusements, sports & physical training
 700  Language
 700  Language
 710  Korean language
 720  Chinese language
 730  Japanese & other Asian languages
 740  English
 750  German
 760  French languages
 770  Spanish languages & Portuguese language
 780  Italian languages
 790  Other languages
 800  Literature
 800  Literature
 810  Korean literature
 820  Chinese literature
 830  Japanese & other Asian literature
 840  English & American literature
 850  German literature
 860  French literature
 870  Spanish & Portuguese literature
 880  Italian literature
 890  Other literatures
 900  History
 900  History
 910  Asia
 920  Europe
 930  Africa
 940  North America
 950  South America
 960  Oceania and Polar regions
 970  [Unassigned]
 980  Geography
 990  Biography

Expansion tables
 Table 1. Standard subdivisions
 Table 2. Geographic Areas
 Table 3. Korean geographic areas
 Table 4. Korean historical period
 Table 5. Languages
 Table 6. Subdivisions of individual languages
 Table 7. Subdivisions of individual literatures
 Table 8. Subdivisions of individual religions

Usage
KDC is used by a wide range of libraries within Korea, including by the National Library of Korea and most school and public libraries in the country, along with some university libraries, such as the one at Youngnam University.

References

Decimal classification systems
Knowledge representation
Libraries in South Korea
Library cataloging and classification